ZiU-10 (Zavod imeni Uritskogo, Russian for Uritsky Factory) or ZIU-10, also referred to as ZIU-683, is a model of trolleybus, built in Russia.  It was manufactured from 1986 until 2008 by the Uritsky Factory, in Engels, which later became Trolza.  It is an articulated, three-axle variant of the ZiU-9/ZiU-682. A modified version of the ZiU-10 is the ZiU-6205.

References

Trolleybuses